Anicetus communis is a parasitic wasp species in the genus Anicetus.

References 

 Annecke, D.P. (1967) The genera |Anicetus| Howard, 1896, |Paracerapterocerus| Girault, 1920, and allies, with descriptions of new genera and species (Hymenoptera: Encyrtidae)., JOURBOOK: Transactions of the Royal Entomological Society of London VOLUME: 119 PAGES: 99–169

External links 
 

Encyrtinae
Insects described in 1967